
Gmina Dąbrowa Białostocka is an urban-rural gmina (administrative district) in Sokółka County, Podlaskie Voivodeship, in north-eastern Poland.

Villages
Apart from the town of Dąbrowa Białostocka, Gmina Dąbrowa Białostocka contains the villages and settlements of Bagny, Bity Kamień, Brzozowo, Brzozowo-Kolonia, Brzozowy Borek, Czarnorzeczka, Grabowo, Grodziszczany, Grzebienie, Hamulka, Harasimowicze, Harasimowicze-Kolonia, Jaczno, Jałówka, Kaszuba, Kirejewszczyzna, Kropiwno, Krugło, Kuderewszczyzna, Lewki, Łozowo, Łozowo-Kolonia, Małowista, Małyszówka-Kolonia, Miedzianowo, Mościcha, Nierośno, Nowa Kamienna, Nowa Wieś, Nowinka, Olsza, Osmołowszczyzna, Ostrowie-Kolonia, Ostrowo, Pięciowłóki, Podbagny, Prohalino, Reszkowce, Różanystok, Sadek, Sadowo, Sławno, Stara Kamienna, Stara Kamienna-Kolonia, Stock, Suchodolina, Szuszalewo, Trzyrzeczki, Wesołowo, Wiązówka, Wroczyńszczyzna, Zujkowszczyzna, Zwierzyniec Mały and Zwierzyniec Wielki.

Neighbouring gminas
Gmina Dąbrowa Białostocka is bordered by the gminas of Janów, Lipsk, Nowy Dwór, Sidra, Suchowola and Sztabin.

References
Polish official population figures 2006

Dabrowa Bialostocka
Sokółka County